Ab Kalaiyeh may refer to:
 Ab Kalaiyeh 1
 Ab Kalaiyeh 2